In English law, contra format collations was a writ to recover donations in a situation where a man had given perpetual alms to a religious house, hospital, school, or the like, and the governor or managers had alienated the lands, contrary to the intention of the donor.

See also
 Contra formam feoffamenti
 Contributione facienda

References

English legal terminology
English property law
Ecclesiastical writs
Legal documents with Latin names